The Chicago Zen Center (CZC) is a Harada-Yasutani Zen practice center located in Evanston, Illinois near Northwestern University currently led by Abbot Yusan Graham. Established in 1974, the Chicago Zen Center formed around an interested group of students who had attended a workshop given by Philip Kapleau in the early 1970s. For many years the center was an affiliate of the Rochester Zen Center in Rochester New York, which had sent teachers there throughout the year to hold sesshins. Today, Chicago Zen Center acts independently of the Rochester Zen Center .

See also
Buddhism in the United States
Timeline of Zen Buddhism in the United States

Notes

References

External links 
 http://www.chicagozen.org
 http://chicagozen.blogspot.com/

Religious buildings and structures in Chicago
Buddhism in Illinois
Zen centers in the United States
Buddhist temples in Illinois